Anklets (pronounced ) are a type of sock. They are not long, typically reaching just below or above the ankle. Anklets are sometimes folded or cuffed over.

See also
 Toe socks
 Dress socks
 Sock
 Anklet

References

Socks
Clothing